Anibal Echeverria (born August 14, 1988) is a Salvadoran footballer who plays for Western Nevada FC Coyotes of the United Premier Soccer League.

Career
Echeverria played one year of college soccer at Feather River College in 2008, where he helped the team advance to the CCCAA North Region playoffs.

Echeverria has played with numerous indoor soccer teams, including Sacramento Surge, San Francisco Stompers, Phenomenos FC and Turlock Express. He signed with United Soccer League side Reno 1868 FC on February 9, 2017.

International
Echeverria has represented El Salvador's national indoor soccer team as part of their Indoor World Cup squad in 2015.

References

External links

1987 births
Living people
Salvadoran footballers
Salvadoran expatriate footballers
Sacramento Surge players
Reno 1868 FC players
USL Championship players
Expatriate soccer players in the United States
American sportspeople of Salvadoran descent
Sportspeople from Reno, Nevada
Soccer players from Nevada
Association football midfielders
Turlock Express
Major Arena Soccer League players
United Premier Soccer League players
Ontario Fury players
Feather River College alumni